Elections to Chorley Borough Council were held on 4 May 2000.  One third of the council was up for election and the Labour party lost overall control of the council to no overall control.

After the election, the composition of the council was:

Election result

References
2000 Chorley election result
Gloves are off for elections

2000 English local elections
2000
2000s in Lancashire